The 1968 Trans-American Championship was the third running of the Sports Car Club of America's Trans-Am Series. 1968 marked the addition of the 12 Hours of Sebring and the 24 Hours of Daytona, the only year that the Trans-Am Series featured those races. The season also marked the first time that an event was held outside of the United States, when a race at Mont-Tremblant brought Trans-Am into Quebec, Canada. 

The championship was open to SCCA Sedans, which were required to conform with FIA Group 1 Series Production Touring Car or Group 2 Touring Car regulations. A Manufacturers Champion was determined in both Over 2-liter and Under 2-liter classes. The titles were awarded to Chevrolet (thanks to Mark Donohue's unprecedented 8 race winning streak, and Chevrolet winning 10 out of 13 races) and Porsche (thanks to Tony Adamowicz' 5 race class winning streak and Porsche's eight class wins in a row) respectively.

Schedule

Championships

Points system
Points were awarded to manufacturers according to the finishing positions in each race. 

Only the highest-placed car scored points for the manufacturer and only the best 10 finishes counted towards the championship.

Drivers' championships were not awarded in Trans-Am until 1972.

Over 2.0 Liter Manufacturers Championship standings

Under 2.0 Liter Manufacturers Championship standings

See also
1968 Can-Am season
1968 United States Road Racing Championship season

References

External links
 1966-1972 General Competition Rules, www.camaros.org

 1968 Trans-Am season review, www.camaros.org

Trans-Am Series
Transam
Transam